Christina Nimand Hansen (formerly Pedersen; born 15 December 1982) is a Danish former team handball goalkeeper.

At the 2010 European Women's Handball Championship she reached the bronze final and placed fourth with the Danish team.

References

External links

1982 births
Living people
Danish female handball players
Viborg HK players
Handball players at the 2012 Summer Olympics
Olympic handball players of Denmark
Handball players from Copenhagen